Isaiah Major (born January 9, 1970 in Chicago, Illinois, United States) best known as DJ Rush, is an American musician, DJ and record producer of electronic music.

Early life and career beginnings

Isaiah Major was born in Chicago, Illinois, United States. Isaiah finished his degree in Computer Operations, Anger Management and won several first place awards in Art competitions.

DJ Rush is a well known DJ in the European techno scene, having played in Techno BAM (Barcelona), Barcelona de Noche (Barcelona), Sala del Cel (Girona), Rachdingue (Vilajuïga), I Love Techno (Ghent), Tresor (Berlin), Love Parade (Berlin), Palazzo (Bingen),Dolnov(Lukavac,BiH), La Real (Oviedo), Florida 135 (Fraga), Hafentunnel (Erfurt), Awakenings (Amsterdam), Tomorrowland (Boom) and Sziget Fesztivál (Budapest).

In the blooming house scene of Chicago, DJ Rush quickly rose to prominence in the electronic music genre. He made his first appearances as a DJ in the Chicago clubs Music Box, the Powerhouse and the Warehouse where he played his sets for up to ten hours. He also began producing.

In 1991 DJ Rush released his first single ("Knee Deep") on the label Trax Records. He began to gain ground in London and Berlin. In 1996 he released two full-length albums on Trax Records.

In 1998 DJ Rush successfully had a Europe-wide breakthrough with the record "Motherfucking Bass". It was widely regarded as one of the "club hymns" of that year. Following this success he teamed up with Tina Panitzke to start the booking agency and record label Kne'Deep in Berlin. In 2001 he displaced Jeff Mills as the Reader's Choice for most popular DJ in Groove-Magazine (a German magazine for electronic music released since 1989).

As his fame grew, he used his status to help up and coming techno artists get their breakthrough by remixing their tracks or releasing them on his label, Kne'Deep. 
He sometimes DJ's and MC's simultaneously as a unique way to entertain the crowd. DJ Rush is often regarded as one of the most iconic persons of techno.

DJ Rush is 6' 6" (1.98 m) tall.

Discography

Albums

Singles and EPs

DJ Mixes

References

External links 
 
 
 
 
 

1970 births
American techno musicians
Living people